Duke Farms is an estate that was established by James Buchanan Duke, an American entrepreneur who founded Duke Power and the American Tobacco Company. Located in Hillsborough, New Jersey, the property is managed by the Doris Duke Foundation after the death of Doris Duke, James B. Duke's daughter and the second owner. After extensive reorganization, Duke Farms was opened to the public on May 19, 2012.

History
Starting in 1893, "Buck" Duke started to buy land next to the Raritan River in rural New Jersey. His vision was to create a farm similar to those in North Carolina where he had grown up. He engaged a number of architects and engineers to fulfill his dream, including Buckenham & Miller, James Leal Greenleaf and Ellen Biddle Shipman. Eventually he had assembled about 2,700 acres (11 km²) of farm and wood lands that contained 45 buildings, 9 lakes, 18 miles of roads, 810 acres of woodlands, 464 acres of grassland bird habitat and 1.5 miles of stone walls.

Duke died in 1925, and his 12-year-old daughter, Doris Duke, gained control of the property after suing her mother, who had wanted to sell it. She restored it and moved in at the age of fifteen. She was very invested in the property and made it her main residence. She incorporated innovative ecological farming methods she learned from Louis Bromfield's Malabar Farm. Starting in 1958 she created and designed over a five-year period a unique botanical display in the Horace Trumbauer conservatory and greenhouses known as Duke Gardens. Duke Gardens opened to the public in 1964. Doris Duke died in 1993.

As park for the public 

Duke Farms is owned by the Duke Farms Foundation (DFF) that was established in 1998 to manage the estate. The Foundation, in turn, is part of the Doris Duke Charitable Foundation. A decision was made to renovate the estate as "a model of environmental stewardship in the 21st Century and (to) inspire visitors to become informed stewards of the land." While reorganizing the estate little was accessible to the public. In 2008, the DFF created some controversy when it permanently closed Duke Gardens demolishing the indoor display gardens that had been created by Doris Duke. Over the years, the DFF created new indoor and outdoor display gardens that are eco-friendly, use native plants, and are wheelchair accessible. In the process of rehabilitation numerous invasive foreign plants were removed including Norwegian maple and Asian Ailanthus and replaced by native species. The property has a number of notable trees, including four of the ten oldest trees of New Jersey, and two champion trees, a Northern Red Oak and an Amur Cork Tree. On May 19, 2012, Duke Farms opened to the public. After a $45-million renovation, Duke Farms now include 30 endangered species and 230 varieties of birds, among which are the great blue heron and the bald eagle. As part of the rehabilitation the conservatory and greenhouses known as the Orchid Range were renovated and became more energy-efficient. The Farm Barn was remodeled to become the Orientation Center. 

In 2016, the mansion where Doris Duke lived was demolished in order to open up the north side of the property.

Gallery

See also

Rough Point
Shangri La (Doris Duke)
Falcon's Lair

References

External links

Official website
Doris Duke Charitable Foundation

Buildings and structures in Somerset County, New Jersey
Duke family residences
Nature centers in New Jersey
Tourist attractions in Somerset County, New Jersey
Protected areas of Somerset County, New Jersey
Hillsborough Township, New Jersey